Westwood Historic District may refer to:

in the United States
(by state)
Westwood Historic District (Muncie, Indiana), listed on the NRHP in Indiana
Westwood Farm, Jeffersontown, KY, a historic district listed on the NRHP in Kentucky
Westwood Town Center Historic District, Cincinnati, OH, listed on the NRHP in Ohio
Westwood (Uniontown, Alabama), listed on the NRHP in Alabama
Westwood (Knoxville, Tennessee), listed on the NRHP in Tennessee
Westwood Plantation, Uniontown, AL, listed on the NRHP in Alabama

See also
Westwood (disambiguation)